San Juan Airlines is a commuter airline operating scheduled and charter flights in the U.S. state of Washington and the Canadian province of British Columbia. Its main base of operations is Bellingham near the San Juan Islands.  The airline's fleet consists of Cessna 172, 206 and 207 aircraft. 
In 1981, San Juan Airlines acquired Pearson Aircraft which was based in Port Angeles, Washington.

On 21 May 2014, Northwest Sky Ferry, which operated since 2007, merged into San Juan Airlines.
In May 2019, San Juan Airlines became the third airline to begin weekly passenger service at the Paine Field airport in Snohomish County, WA.

Destinations
 Washington, United States
Anacortes – Anacortes Airport
 Bellingham – Bellingham International Airport
 Friday Harbor (San Juan Island) – Friday Harbor Airport
 Lopez Island – Lopez Island Airport
 Orcas Island – Orcas Island Airport
 Decatur Island - Decatur Shores Airport
 Center Island - Center Island Airport
 Waldron Island - Waldronaire Airport
 Stuart Island - Stuart Island Airport West/East
 Point Roberts - Point Roberts Airpark
 Port Angeles – William R. Fairchild International Airport
 Port Townsend – Olympia Airport
 Everett – Paine Field
 Arlington – Arlington Airport
 Renton – Renton Airport
 Seattle – Boeing Field
 Olympia – Olympia Airport
 Tacoma – Tacoma Narrows Airport

 Oregon, United States
 Portland – Portland Airport

 British Columbia, Canada
 Campbell River – Campbell River Airport
 Nanaimo – Nanaimo Airport
 Port Hardy – Port Hardy Airport
 Tofino – Tofino Airport
 Vancouver – Vancouver International Airport
 Victoria – Victoria International Airport

Fleet 

 2 – Cessna 172 Skyhawk 
 3 – Cessna 207 Skywagon 
 1 – Cessna 206 Stationair 

San Juan Airlines has previously used Cessna Caravan, Beechcraft 99 and Embraer EMB-110 Bandeirante turboprops as well as Britten-Norman Islander and Cessna 402 prop aircraft.

References

External links 

Regional airlines of the United States
Airlines established in 1947
Airlines based in Washington (state)
Transportation in San Juan County, Washington
1947 establishments in Washington (state)
American companies established in 1947